Atractus carrioni, Parker's ground snake or Carrion's ground snake, is a species of snake in the family Colubridae. The species can be found in Ecuador.

References 

Atractus
Reptiles of Ecuador
Endemic fauna of Ecuador
Snakes of South America
Reptiles described in 1930
Taxa named by Hampton Wildman Parker